William John Waltersheid (born November 18, 1956) is an American bishop of the Roman Catholic Church. He has been serving as an auxiliary bishop of the Diocese of Pittsburgh in Pennsylvania since 2011.

Biography

Early life 
William Waltersheid was born in Ashland, Pennsylvania on November 18, 1956. After his high school graduation, Waltersheid worked in healthcare, graduating from the Pottsville Hospital School of Nursing in 1983. He entered seminary in 1985, graduating from St. John Seminary College in Boston, Massachusetts. Waltersheid then entered the Pontifical Gregorian University in Rome, receiving a degree in theology and a Licentiate in Dogmatic Theology in 1991.

Priesthood 
Waltersheid was ordained a priest by Bishop Nicholas Dattilo of the Diocese of Harrisburg on July 11, 1992. He remained in Rome for further studies until 1995, after which he was appointed vicar at a parish in Steelton, Pennsylvania. Returning to Rome, he served on the faculty of the Pontifical North American College until 2003.  Waltersheid served as pastor at St. Patrick Parish in Carlisle, Pennsylvania, from June 2003 to June 2006. He served as diocesan secretary for clergy and consecrated Life in Harrisburg starting in June 2006.

Auxiliary Bishop of Pittsburgh
Waltersheid was appointed auxiliary bishop of the Diocese of Pittsburgh with the titular see of California on February 25, 2011. On March 11, 2011, Watersheid was appointed as episcopal vicar for clergy and secretary for clergy. Waltersheid was consecrated by Bishop David Zubik on April 25, 2011, at St. Paul's Cathedral in Pittsburgh. Waltersheid's episcopal motto is Ecce Mater Tua (Latin for Behold thy mother, from John 19:27.

See also

 Catholic Church hierarchy
 Catholic Church in the United States
 Historical list of the Catholic bishops of the United States
 List of Catholic bishops of the United States
 Lists of patriarchs, archbishops, and bishops

References

External links
Roman Catholic Diocese of Pittsburgh Official Site
Diocesan biography of Aux. Bp. Waltersheid
Video of Aux. Bp. Waltersheid's installation Mass

Episcopal succession

 

1956 births
Living people
People from Ashland, Pennsylvania
21st-century American Roman Catholic titular bishops
Pontifical Gregorian University alumni
Pontifical North American College alumni
Catholics from Pennsylvania